Feest is a surname. Notable people with the surname include:

Christian Feest (born 1945), Austrian ethnologist and ethnohistorian
Gerhard Feest (born 1941, adopted 2000 the name Gleich of his second wife), Austrian artist and professor emeritus of the Academy of Fine Arts Vienna in Vienna
Gregory A. Feest (born 1956), United States Air Force Air Force major general
Johannes Feest (born 1939), German penologist and sociologist of law

See also 
Alle dagen feest, Dutch film
Fest (disambiguation)